The Bruce Mason Playwriting Award is an annual award that recognises the work of an outstanding emerging New Zealand playwright. The winner is decided by the votes of a panel of leading New Zealand artistic directors and script advisors.

The award is named after New Zealand's playwright Bruce Mason CBE (1921–1982). Mason's best known plays are The End of the Golden Weather and the Pohutukawa Tree.

The award was established by Independent Newspapers in 1983, the year after Mason's death, with assistance from Playmarket, for an amount of $2,000. It is currently a $10,000 award managed by Playmarket and has been funded over the years by the FAME Trust (Fund for Acting and Musical Endeavours), Downstage Theatre Society, Bruce Mason Trust and Rachel and David Underwood.

Bruce Mason Playwriting Award recipients 

 1983 Fiona Farrell
 1984 Simon O'Connor
 1985 Stephanie Johnson
 1986 Rosie Scott
 1987 Sarah Delahunty
 1988 Stuart Hoar
 1989 James Beaumont
 1990 John Broughton (dentist)
 1991 David Geary
 1992 Hone Kouka
 1993 Vivienne Plumb
 1994 Duncan Sarkies
 1995 Briar Grace-Smith
 1996 John Vakidis
 1997 Jo Randerson
 1998 Oscar Kightley
 1999 Toa Fraser
 2000 Stuart McKenzie
 2001 Victor Rodger
 2002 Mitch Tawhi Thomas
 2003–5 No award made
 2006 Albert Belz
 2007 Michael Galvin
 2008 Paul Rothwell
 2009 Pip Hall
 2010 Eli Kent
 2011 Arthur Meek (playwright)
 2012 Whiti Hereaka
 2013 Jamie McCaskill
 2014 Ralph McCubbin Howell
 2015 Jess Sayer
 2016 Sam Brooks
 2017 Mīria George
 2018 Ahi Karunaharan
 2019  Nancy Brunning
 2020 Emily Duncan
 2021 Nathan Joe

References 

New Zealand literary awards
Awards established in 1983